Bruno Puja (born 20 January 2000) is an Albanian professional footballer who plays as a goalkeeper for Albanian club Kastrioti Krujë.

Club career

Early career
Puja started his youth career at age 11 with hometown club Besa Kavajë. He joined the U-13 team on 1 September 2011.
During the 2015–16 season he played for the U-19 team in Albanian Superliga U-19 group B.

Besa Kavajë
He made his first professional debut at age 15 with Besa Kavajë under coach Dorjan Bubeqi in the 2015–16 Albanian Cup match against Laçi on 16 September 2015, coming on as a substitute at half-time in place of Klajdo Arkaxhiu. The match finished in a 1–3 loss.

Career statistics

Club

International career
Following his first professional debut with Besa Kavajë in September 2015, Puja was immediately called up at Albania national under-17 football team by coach Džemal Mustedanagić to participate in the 2016 UEFA European Under-17 Championship qualification from 22–27 October 2015. He played two full 80-minute matches on two first match-days against Switzerland U17 and Netherlands U17, but Albania U17 lost both matches. For the closing match against Wales U17 he was an unused substitute and the coach Džemal Mustedanagić left his place to fellow goalkeeper Everest Braçe.

References

External links

Bruno Puja  FSHF profile

2000 births
Living people
Footballers from Kavajë
Albanian footballers
Albania youth international footballers
Association football goalkeepers
Besa Kavajë players
KS Kastrioti players
Kategoria Superiore players
Kategoria e Parë players